Thomas Beaumont may refer to:

Thomas de Beaumont, 6th Earl of Warwick (1208–1242), English peer
Thomas Beaumont (died c. 1582), MP for Norwich in 1572
Sir Thomas Beaumont (died 1614) (1576–1614), of Stoughton Grange, MP for Leicestershire, 1604
Thomas Beaumont, 1st Viscount Beaumont of Swords (died 1625), Irish peer, MP for Leicestershire and Viscount Beaumont of Swords
Thomas Beaumont, 3rd Viscount Beaumont of Swords (1634–1702), Irish peer, Viscount Beaumont of Swords
Sir Thomas Beaumont, 1st Baronet (died 1676), English MP for Leicestershire
Thomas Richard Beaumont (1758–1829), British MP for Northumberland 1795–1818
Thomas Wentworth Beaumont (1792–1848), British MP for Stafford, Northumberland 1818–1826, 1830–1832, and South Northumberland

See also
Beaumont (disambiguation)